(The Raft of the Medusa) is a secular oratorio by the German composer Hans Werner Henze. It is regarded as a seminal work in the composer's alignment with left-wing politics.

Background
Henze wrote it as a Requiem for Che Guevara, and set it to a text by Ernst Schnabel. It tells the story of the French frigate Méduse which ran aground off the west coast of Africa in 1816, an ignominious episode in French political and maritime history, immortalised by the 1818-19 painting of the same name by Théodore Géricault. The oratorio employs a large orchestra, a speaker, a soprano, a baritone, and choruses. In the course of a performance, the chorus members move from left side of the stage, "the Side of the Living", to the right side, "the Side of the Dead". The text is principally in German, with the addition of passages in Italian drawn from Dante's Divina Comedia sung by some of the dead. Aside from the dedication, and one possible musical reference to a popular leftist slogan chant of the 1960s, "there's very little else in the text or music arouse political emotions", wrote one critic. He thought the work "expertly put together, scintillating in its scoring and at [its] best moments ... a superheated, expressionist narrative."

Performance history
The first performance was scheduled for 9 December 1968 at the Planten un Blomen Hall in Hamburg. Just before it was due to begin, a student hung a large poster of Che Guevara on the rostrum rail, which was torn down by an official from NDR radio. Some students then hoisted the Red Flag and another Che portrait; some anarchists raised the Black Flag. At this point, although Henze and soloists had arrived onstage, the RIAS choir started chanting "Under the Red Flag we sing not" and left the stage. After some scuffles, the police arrived and began removing the students, taking Schnabel with them. Henze reappeared, stating that the police intervention had made a performance impossible, and led part of the audience in a chant of "Ho, Ho, Ho Chi Minh!" before they dispersed, the premiere cancelled.

However, prior to the aborted performance a recording of the dress rehearsal was made, with soloists Edda Moser, Dietrich Fischer-Dieskau, Charles Régnier, several choirs and the Sinfonieorchester des Norddeutschen Rundfunks, conducted by the composer.

It was finally premiered at a concert performance at the Musikverein in Vienna on 29 January 1971, and its first stage production was given at the Staatstheater Nürnberg on 15 April 1972. Henze revised the work in 1990, and it has been performed on several occasions since, notably in 2006 by the Berlin Philharmonic conducted by Sir Simon Rattle at the Berliner Philharmonie concert hall.

Roles
La Mort (soprano)
Jean Charles (baritone)
Charon (narrator)
Chorus of the Living
Chorus of the Dead (mixed coir)
Children's choir

Structure

Part 1
Die Einschiffung zum Untergang [embarkation for disaster]

Part 2
Die neunte Nacht und der Morgen [ninth night and the morning]

References

Further reading
Hamel, Peter Michael. 2000. "Politisches Komponieren damals und heute: Persönliche Rückblicke und Einsichten". In Kultur, Bildung, Politik: Festschrift für Hermann Rauhe zum 70. Geburtstag, edited by Wolfgang Hochstein and Hanns-Werner Heiser, 735–751. Hamburg: Bockel. 
Traber, Habakuk. 2000. "Musik ergreift die Fahnen: Die Skandale um Henzes Floß der Medusa und Nonos Intolleranza 1960". Neue Zeitschrift für Musik 161, no. 3 (May–June): 34–41.

External links
Work details, Schott Music

German-language oratorios
1968 compositions
Art works that caused riots
Music controversies
Compositions by Hans Werner Henze
Cultural depictions of Che Guevara
Music dedicated to causes or groups